Jinny Yu (born 1976) is a Canadian artist working primarily in the fields of painting and installation art.

Life and work

Jinny Yu was born in Seoul, South Korea. She immigrated to Canada in 1988, settling in Montreal. Yu studied fine arts at Dawson College, earning a degree in fine arts in 1995, followed by a Bachelor of Fine Arts at Concordia University three years later. During the mid- and late-1990s, Yu taught art at various schools in Quebec and at the American School of Paris in France. She studied at York University, earning her Master of Business Administration degree in Arts and Media Administration and Master of Fine Arts degree in Visual Arts in 2002. From 2003 until 2005, Yu worked as an assistant professor at Mount Allison University in New Brunswick. She left Mount Allison to serve as a research fellow at the Centre for Studies on Technologies in Distributed Intelligence Systems at Venice International University for a year. Yu participated in several artist residencies—in Berlin and Beijing, and at the Banff Centre in Alberta—before teaching in the Department of Visual Arts at the University of Ottawa in 2007. Today, she serves as Professor at the University of Ottawa. Yu resides in Ottawa, Canada.

Yu's painting series, Story of a Global Nomad, in 2007-2008, examined the socio-economic impact of architecture. Along with that series, Yu's work Sequence, 2009, established her artistic reputation. Other subjects Yu has explored through her work include detachment, connected to her experiences in immigration and relocation, which she calls "global nomadism," and the relationship between painting and space. In 2015, Yu exhibited the site-specific work Don't They Ever Stop Migrating? during the 56th Venice Biennale at the Oratorio di San Ludovico. The installation work used Alfred Hitchcock's 1963 film The Birds as a metaphor for the migration crises in the Mediterranean Sea and Bay of Bengal. The work is now in the permanent collection of the Agnes Etherington Art Centre.

Notable collections
Don't They Ever Stop Migrating?, Ink on fabric and sound installation, 2015, Agnes Etherington Art Centre
Ball, Oil on mirror, 2014, Ottawa Art Gallery
Story of a Global Nomad (Multiple Trees), oil and graphite on aluminum, 2007, Musée national des beaux-arts du Québec
Story of a Global Nomad (De Vonk 1), oil and graphite on aluminum, 2007, Canada Council

Further reading
Burant, Jim. Ottawa Art & Artists: An Illustrated History. Toronto: Art Canada Institute, 2022. 
Foscari, Antonio and Jinny Yu. Jinny Yu (NONE). Ottawa: University of Ottawa Press (2008). 
Tiampo, Ming. "Jinny Yu: Don’t They Ever Stop Migrating?". Asian Diasporic Visual Cultures and the Americas 4.1-2: 217-219. https://doi.org/10.1163/23523085-00401016 Web.

References

External links

Living people
1976 births
Artists from Seoul
Artists from Ottawa
21st-century Canadian painters
21st-century Canadian women artists
Canadian women painters
Academic staff of the University of Ottawa
Concordia University alumni
Dawson College alumni
York University alumni